Foleyet railway station is located in the community of Foleyet, Ontario, Canada. This station is used by Via Rail transcontinental Canadian trains.

External links
 Foleyet railway station

Via Rail stations in Ontario
Railway stations in Sudbury District
Canadian National Railway stations in Ontario
Canadian Northern Railway stations in Ontario